Aubert Pallascio (August 19, 1937 – July 5, 2020) was a Canadian actor. Pallascio trained at the CNSAD and for a period of time worked under the pseudonym Luis Aubert. He has performed on the stages of the Théâtre du Nouveau Monde, Théâtre du Rideau Vert, Théâtre Denise-Pelletier, Trident and Théâtre Jean-Duceppe among others. His notable television credits include roles in Terre humaine, Le parc des Braves, L'Héritage and Omertà. Pallascio portrayed the Canadian Prime Minister in the 1980 film The Kidnapping of the President. He was nominated in 1996 for a Genie Award for Best Performance by an Actor in a Supporting Role for his role in Black List (Liste noire).

Death 
He died on July 5, 2020 at the age of 82 in Montreal after a battle with cancer.

Filmography

References

External links 
 

1937 births
2020 deaths
Canadian male film actors
Canadian male television actors
French Quebecers
Male actors from Montreal
Place of birth missing